Aeropuerto may refer to:

 Aeropuerto (Madrid), a ward in Spain
 Aeropuerto T1-T2-T3 (Madrid Metro), a station serving the Terminal 2 of the Madrid-Barajas Airport
 Aeropuerto T4 (Madrid Metro), a station serving the Terminal 4 of the Madrid-Barajas Airport
 "Aeropuerto", a 2006 song by 2 Minutos
 Aeropuerto, the former name of Boulevard Puerto Aéreo metro station, in Mexico City